Maria Pastori (10 March 1895 - 17 April 1975) was an Italian mathematician.

Life 
Pastori was born in Milan on 10 March 1895, to a family of eight children. The family was of limited means and could not afford education for the children beyond what was provided by the public school system. Pastori excelled in mathematics, which was encouraged by one of her teachers, who aided her in getting a scholarship to Maria Agnesi School, a magisterial school (similar to a teacher's college). After completing her studies at the magisterial school, Pastori then went on to teach elementary school near Milan. While teaching, Pastori studied further with her sister Giuseppina (who became a physician and biologist). At the age of twenty Pastori she sat for the state exams, and earned a baccalaureate with highest honors. She earned a scholarship to the University of Pisa where she earned a doctorate, earning laureate status on her dissertation. After earning her doctorate she became an assistant professor at the University of Milan, working her way up to professor, and eventually the chair of the rational mechanics department. Most of Pastori's research and publications were focused on differential calculus as developed by Gregorio Ricci-Curbastro, as well of the application of mathematics to electromagnets.

References

1895 births
1975 deaths
University of Pisa alumni
Academic staff of the University of Milan
Italian mathematicians
Women mathematicians